Jasmin Lander (born February 4, 2000 in Hvidovre) is a Danish female curler.

Personal life
As of 2022, Lander is a medical laboratory student.

Teams

Women's

Mixed

Mixed doubles

References

External links

Lander, Jasmin | Nordic Junior Curling Tour

Living people
2000 births
Danish female curlers
Danish curling champions
People from Hvidovre Municipality
Curlers at the 2022 Winter Olympics
Olympic curlers of Denmark
Sportspeople from the Capital Region of Denmark
21st-century Danish women